Gol Mahalleh (also Romanized as Gol Maḩalleh) is a village in Siahkalrud Rural District, Chaboksar District, Rudsar County, Gilan Province, Iran. At the 2006 census, its population was 217, in 68 families.

References 

Populated places in Rudsar County